The Ukrainian Cup 1994–95 is the fourth annual edition of Ukraine's football knockout competition, known as the Ukrainian Cup.

The main event started on September 26, 1994, with the round of 32 and concluded with the final game on May 28. The tournament also had couple of preliminaries that started in summer on August 21. Two clubs withdrew from the competition: Lokomotyv Konotop and Shakhtar Horlivka.

The cup holder Chornomorets Odesa was eliminated on away goal rule by Shakhtar Donetsk in semifinals.

Team allocation 
 One hundred seven teams entered the competition.
 3 regions did not provide their representatives (Chernihiv, Donetsk, Poltava)

Distribution

First qualifying round entrants 
 23 regional representatives
 18 Third League (Advis Khmelnytskyi, Avanhard Zhydachiv, Dnistrovets Bilhorod-Dnistrovskyi, Dnister Zalishchiky, Fetrovyk Khust, Keramik Baranivka, Khutrovyk Tysmenytsia, Lada Chernivtsi, LAZ Lviv, Metalurh Novomoskovsk, Nyva Myronivka, Oskil Kupiansk, Shakhtar Horlivka, Sula Lubny, Systema-Boreks Borodianka, Tavria Novotroitsk, Transimpeks Vyshneve, Vahonobudivnyk Kremenchuk)
 11 Second League (Artania Ochakiv, Azovets Mariupol, Chonomorets-2 Odesa, Druzhba Berdiansk, Dynamo Luhansk, Dynamo Saky, Halychyna Drohobych, Harant Donetsk, Hazovyk Komarne, Sirius Zhovti Vody, Tytan Armiansk)
 2 First League (Naftokhimik Kremenchuk, Naftovyk Okhtyrka)

Second qualifying round entrants 
 27 winners of the first qualifying round
 4 Third League (Avanhard Rovenky, CSKA Kyiv, Torpedo Melitopol, Vahonobudivnyk Stakhanov)
 11 Second League (Chaika Sevastopol, Desna Chernihiv, FC Lviv, Medita Shakhtarsk, Meliorator Kakhovka, Metalurh Kerch, Ros Bila Tserkva, Shakhtar Pavlohrad, Tavria Kherson, Viktor Zaporizhzhia, Yavir Krasnopillia)
 20 First League (Bazhanovets Makiivka, Borysfen Boryspil, Bukovyna Chernivtsi, Dnipro Cherkasy, Dynamo-2 Kyiv, Karpaty Mukacheve, Khimik Severodonets, Khimik Zhytomyr, Krystal Chortkiv, Metalist Kharkiv, Metalurh Nikopol, SC Odesa, Nord-Am-Podillia Khmelnytskyi, Polihraftekhnika Oleksandria, SBTS Sumy, Skala Stryi, Stal Alchevsk, Vorskla Poltava, Zakarpattia Uzhhorod, Zirka-NIBAS Kirovohrad)
 2 Top League (Evis Mykolaiv, Prykarpattia Ivano-Frankivsk)

Competition schedule

First Qualifying round 
All games were played on August 21, 1994. Two scheduled games did not take place due to withdrawals.

Second Qualifying round 
All games were played on September 1, 1994.

Third Qualifying round 
All games were played on September 5, 1994. Notice that there was four days break between two rounds. During this round couple of the Premier League clubs were eliminated, without even making it to the main event.

Bracket

Round of 32 

|}

First leg

Second leg 

Dnipro won 5–4 on aggregate

Chornomorets won 6–2 on aggregate

Karpaty won 4–2 on aggregate

Temp won 2–1 on aggregate

Metalurh-Viktor won 3–2 on aggregate

Vorskla won 3–2 on aggregate

Veres won 3–1 on aggregate

Shakhtar won 5–1 on aggregate

Nyva T. won 4–0 on aggregate

Kryvbas won 11–1 on aggregate

Kremin won 7–2 on aggregate

Tavriya won 4–2 on aggregate

Nyva V. won 5–3 on aggregate

Stal won 3–1 on aggregate

Torpedo won 4–3 on aggregate

Dynamo won 4–0 on aggregate

Notes:

Round of 16 

|}

First leg

Second leg 

Dnipro won 4–1 on aggregate

Chornomorets won 3–2 on aggregate

Tavriya won 4–3 on aggregate

Temp won 2–1 on aggregate

Shakhtar won 9–0 on aggregate

Nyva V. won 2–1 on aggregate

Nyva T. won 4–3 on aggregate

Dynamo won 2–1 on aggregate

Notes:

Quarterfinals 

|}

First leg

Second leg 

Shakhtar won 3–1 on aggregate

Chornomorets won 3–1 on aggregate

Tavriya won 3–1 on aggregate

Dnipro won 3–0 on aggregate

Notes:

Semifinals 

|}

First leg

Second leg 

Shakhtar won on away goal rule

Dnipro won 2–1 on aggregate

Notes:

Final 

The final was held at the Republican Stadium on May 28, 1995, in Kyiv.

Note, Skrypnyk (Dnipro) started the penalty shootout.

Top goalscorers

Attendances

Top attendances

See also 
 Ukrainian Premier League 1994-95

References

External links 
 Calendar of Matches—Schedule of the Ukrainian Cup. 
 Info on the final 

Ukrainian Cup seasons
Cup
Ukrainian Cup